Justin Gensoul (22 June 1781, in Connaux – 25 February 1848), was a 19th-century French playwright and chansonnier.

Gensoul also authored his plays under his sole first name "Justin".

Works 
L'Aigle et la colombe, 1811 ;
 Almanach des Muses, Paris
 Arlequin à Alger, comédie-parade in 1 act and in vaudevilles, with Rougement, Paris, Vaudeville, 25 April 1807 ;
 Le baiser au porteur, vaudeville in 1 act with Eugène Scribe and de Courcy, 1824 ;
 Blanche ;
 Chacun son tour, opera in 1 act, music by Solié ;
 Le Congé, ou la Veille des noces, comédie-vaudeville in 1 act and in prose, with Rougement, Paris, Vaudeville, 15 March 1810 ;
 Le Coureur d'héritages, comedy in 3 acts and in verses 
 Les Deux mousquetaires, ou la Robe de chambre, opéra comique in 1 act, with J.-C. Vial. music by M. Berton. Paris, Opéra-comique, 22 December 1824 
 Le Français à Venise, opéra comique in 1 act, music by M. Nicolo, de Malthe. Paris, Opéra-comique, 14 June 1813 
 Lord Davenant, drama in 4 acts and in prose, with J.-B.-C. Vial and Milcent. Paris, Théâtre-français, 8 October 1825 
 Mon premier pas, 1803 
 Nadir et Sélim, ou les Deux artistes, opera comique in 3 acts, music by M. Romagnesi, Paris, Opéra-comique, 27 July 1822 ;
 Philocles, opera in 2 acts, music by Dourlen, 1806 
 Le Projet singulier, comedy in 1 act and in verses, Paris, Théâtre de l'Impératrice, 2 germinal an XIII (1805);
 Prologue pour l'ouverture du nouveau théâtre de Semur 
 Société d'émulation de Cambrai. Concours de poésie. [Épître sur le théâtre, par M. Justin Gensoul. Le Fugitif, by S. Henri Berthoud. Sur l'entrée de S. A. R. Mgr le duc d'Angoulême in Spain, by M. Alphonse Flavol.] Séance publique 16 August 1823 
 Le Tardif, comedy in 1 act and in verses, Paris, Théâtre-français, 8 December 1824 
 Le Valet intrigué, comedy in prose, Paris, Odéon, 10 March 1812.

Some songs 
 Le Baiser du matin
 La table
 L'angélus
 Le bon mari
 Le premier voyage

19th-century French dramatists and playwrights
French chansonniers
1781 births
1848 deaths